Dewi Sant Hospital is a small hospital on Albert Road, in Pontypridd, Rhondda Cynon Taf, Wales. It is managed by the Cwm Taf Morgannwg University Health Board.

History
The hospital has its origins in the Pontypridd Union Workhouse which was completed in 1865. An infirmary and isolation hospital were built on the site in the late 19th century. The tunnel mouth of Pontypridd Graig railway station, which emerges into in the hospital car park, was last used in 1930.

The complex joined the National Health Service as Graig Hospital in 1948. After the war it became a geriatric hospital before being completely re-built as Dewi Sant Hospital in the 1960s.

References

External links 
 Cwm Taf University Health Board

Hospitals in Rhondda Cynon Taf
Hospitals established in 1865
1865 establishments in Wales
Buildings and structures in Rhondda Cynon Taf
NHS hospitals in Wales
Pontypridd
Cwm Taf Morgannwg University Health Board